Colonel Eric Lawrence Barry CD GCStJ (1927–2015) was a Canadian Army officer, who served as Lord Prior of the Venerable Order of St John from 2002 until 2008.

Honour Ribbon of the Order of St John:

 : Venerable Order of St John (GCStJ)
 : Canadian Forces Decoration (CD)

See also 
 The Royal Canadian Hussars (Montreal)
 Order of Saint John

References

External links
 www.stjohninternational.org 
 www.sja.ca

 
 

1927 births
2015 deaths
Canadian military personnel from Ontario
Bailiffs Grand Cross of the Order of St John
Canadian Anglicans
Canadian Army officers
Royal Canadian Hussars
Royal Canadian Hussars (Montreal) officers